Boules is one of the sports at the quadrennial Mediterranean Games competition. It has been a sport in the program of the Mediterranean Games since its inception in 1997.

Editions

All-time medal table
Updated after the 2022 Mediterranean Games

References
Mediterranean Games 1997 Results (PDF file)
Mediterranean Games 2001 Results (PDF file)
Mediterranean Games 2005 Results (PDF file)
Official website of the 2009 Mediterranean Games (archived)
Official website of the 2013 Mediterranean Games (archived)

 
Bocce